Ascendancy may refer to:
 Protestant Ascendancy, Anglo-Irish ruling class of Ireland from the 17th to early 20th centuries
 Ascendancy (album), a 2005 album by American heavy metal band Trivium.
 Ascendancy (film)
 Ascendancy (video game)
 Ascendency, sometimes spelled "ascendancy", a quantitative attribute of an ecosystem.

See also
Ascend (disambiguation)
Ascender (disambiguation)